The genus Macrocarpaea, with 105 species and two hybrids of 0.5 m herbs, shrubs, epiphytes and small trees to 10 m tall, is the largest genus of the tribe Helieae of the gentian family (Gentianaceae). Species of Macrocarpaea have diurnal and nocturnal pollinators, visited during the day by hummingbirds, insects and butterflies, and at night by bats, moths and many different kinds of insects.  The common name for the genus is 'Moon-gentian'. No species are known in cultivation.

Characteristics
Species of this genus have white, cream, yellow to green flowers. Most have a large, open campanulate to funnel-form corolla adapted to nocturnal bat pollination. This genus is one of the few of the gentian family that have species with hairs on their leaves.

Distribution
Macrocarpaea has a relatively broad distribution in mountainous regions of the Neotropics.  The Neotropics comprise the tropical parts of the New World in Mesoamerica and South America.  The gentian tribe Helieae, to which Macrocarpaea belongs is restricted to the Neotropics. The overall distribution pattern of Macrocarpaea is typical of many Neotropical taxa.  The genus is basically found in five major geographic regions: the Andes [ranging from Venezuela, Colombia, Ecuador, Peru, to Bolivia] (85 species), southern Mesoamerica [Costa Rica and Panama] (6 species), the Greater Antilles of the Caribbean [Cuba, Dominican Republic, Jamaica] (3 species), the Pantepui of the Guayana Shield [Venezuela, and adjacent regions in Brazil and Guyana] (6 species), and southeastern Brazil (5 species).

Highlighted species
Macrocarpaea dies-viridis  "Named for the American punk rock music group Green Day, whose music we listened to, especially while driving to localities throughout Ecuador during out 2006 expedition". Published in Harvard Papers in Botany 11(2): 132. 2007.  The common name for the plant is "the Green Day moon-gentian".

Macrocarpaea apparata  Named for the verb to apparate, made popular in the book Harry Potter and the Chamber of Secrets by J.K. Rowling (1998)
"When we first found this new species, we could only find sterile individuals.  After looking all afternoon, and only just before dusk, we finally found several flowering plants that seem to have 'apparated' in front of us, appearing out of nowhere." Published in Harvard Papers in Botany 8(1): 66. 2003.  The common name is the "Apparating moon-gentian". See photos to the right.

Macrocarpaea pringleana  Named to honour Dr. James Pringle, Plant Taxonomist at Canada's Royal Botanical Gardens in Hamilton and Burlington, Ontario. Dr. Pringle has contributed extensively over a very long and distinguished career to both the systematics of the Gentian family and to floras of South America. Published in Harvard Papers in Botany  9(1): 11-49.

Species

Macrocarpaea affinis Ewan
Macrocarpaea angelliae J.R. Grant & Struwe
Macrocarpaea angustifolia J.S. Pringle
Macrocarpaea apparata J.R. Grant & Struwe
Macrocarpaea arborescens Gilg
Macrocarpaea auriculata Weaver & J.R. Grant
Macrocarpaea autanae Weaver
Macrocarpaea ayangannae J.R. Grant, Struwe & Boggan
Macrocarpaea bangiana Gilg
Macrocarpaea berryi J.R. Grant
Macrocarpaea betancuriana J.R. Grant
Macrocarpaea biremis J.R. Grant
Macrocarpaea bracteata Ewan
Macrocarpaea browallioides (Ewan) A. Robyns & Nilsson
Macrocarpaea bubops J.R. Grant & Struwe
Macrocarpaea callejasii J.R. Grant
Macrocarpaea calophylla Gilg
Macrocarpaea canoëfolia J.R. Grant
Macrocarpaea chthonotropa J.R. Grant
Macrocarpaea cinchonifolia (Gilg) Weaver
Macrocarpaea claireae J.R. Grant
Macrocarpaea cochabambensis Gilg-Ben.
Macrocarpaea densiflora (Benth) Ewan
Macrocarpaea dillonii J.R. Grant
Macrocarpaea dies-viridis J.R. Grant
Macrocarpaea domingensis Urb. & Ekman
Macrocarpaea duquei Gilg-Ben.
Macrocarpaea elix J.R. Grant
Macrocarpaea ericii J.R. Grant
Macrocarpaea ewaniana Weaver & J.R. Grant
Macrocarpaea fortisiana J.R. Grant
Macrocarpaea gattaca J.R. Grant
Macrocarpaea gaudialis J.R. Grant
Macrocarpaea glabra (L.f.) Gilg
Macrocarpaea glaziovii Gilg
Macrocarpaea gondoloides J.R. Grant
Macrocarpaea gracilis Weaver & J.R. Grant
Macrocarpaea gran-pajatena J.R. Grant
Macrocarpaea gravabilis J.R. Grant
Macrocarpaea gulosa J.R. Grant
Macrocarpaea harlingii J.S. Pringle
Macrocarpaea hilarula J.R. Grant
Macrocarpaea illecebrosa J.R. Grant
Macrocarpaea innarrabilis J.R. Grant
Macrocarpaea jactans J.R. Grant
Macrocarpaea jalca J.R. Grant
Macrocarpaea jensii J.R. Grant & Struwe
Macrocarpaea jocularis J.R. Grant
Macrocarpaea kayakifolia J.R. Grant
Macrocarpaea kuelap J.R. Grant
Macrocarpaea kuepferiana J.R. Grant
Macrocarpaea lacrossiformis J.R. Grant
Macrocarpaea laudabilis J.R. Grant
Macrocarpaea lenae J.R. Grant
Macrocarpaea loranthoides (Griseb.) Maas
Macrocarpaea luctans J.R. Grant
Macrocarpaea lucubrans J.R. Grant
Macrocarpaea luna-gentiana J.R. Grant & Struwe
Macrocarpaea luteynii J.R. Grant & Struwe
Macrocarpaea luya J.R. Grant
Macrocarpaea macrophylla (Kunth) Gilg
Macrocarpaea maguirei Weaver & J.R. Grant
Macrocarpaea marahuacae Struwe & V.A. Albert
Macrocarpaea maryae J.R. Grant
Macrocarpaea micrantha Gilg
Macrocarpaea neblinae Maguire & Steyermark
Macrocarpaea neillii J.R. Grant
Macrocarpaea nicotianifolia Weaver & J.R. Grant
Macrocarpaea noctiluca J.R. Grant & Struwe
Macrocarpaea normae J.R. Grant
Macrocarpaea obnubilata J.R. Grant
Macrocarpaea obtusifolia (Griseb.) Gilg
Macrocarpaea opulenta J.R. Grant
Macrocarpaea ostentans J.R. Grant
Macrocarpaea pachyphylla Gilg
Macrocarpaea pachystyla Gilg
Macrocarpaea pajonalis J.R. Grant
Macrocarpaea papillosa Weaver & J.R. Grant
Macrocarpaea pinetorum Alain
Macrocarpaea piresii Maguire
Macrocarpaea pringleana J.R. Grant
Macrocarpaea quechua J.R. Grant
Macrocarpaea quizhpei J.R. Grant
Macrocarpaea revoluta (Ruiz & Pavon) Gilg
Macrocarpaea robin-fosteri J.R. Grant
Macrocarpaea rubra Malme
Macrocarpaea rugosa Steyerm.
Macrocarpaea schultesii Weaver & J.R. Grant
Macrocarpaea silverstonei J.R. Grant
Macrocarpaea sodiroana Gilg
Macrocarpaea stenophylla Gilg
Macrocarpaea subcaudata Ewan
Macrocarpaea subsessilis Weaver & J.R. Grant
Macrocarpaea tabula-fluctivagifolia J.R. Grant
Macrocarpaea tahuantinsuyuana J.R. Grant
Macrocarpaea thamnoides (Griseb.) Gilg
Macrocarpaea umerulus J.R. Grant
Macrocarpaea valerii Standl.
Macrocarpaea viscosa (Ruiz & Pavon) Gilg
Macrocarpaea voluptuosa J.R. Grant
Macrocarpaea wallnoeferi J.R. Grant
Macrocarpaea weaveri J.R. Grant
Macrocarpaea weigendiorum J.R. Grant
Macrocarpaea wurdackii Weaver & J.R. Grant
Macrocarpaea xerantifulva J.R. Grant
Macrocarpaea ypsilocaule J.R. Grant
Macrocarpaea zophoflora Weaver & J.R. Grant

Catalogue of hybrids
Macrocarpaea x acuminata J.R. Grant (M. subcaudata x M. valerii)
Macrocarpaea x mattii J.R. Grant (M. noctiluca x M. subsessilis)

References

 Carlquist, S. 1984. Wood anatomy of some Gentianaceae: Systematic and Ecological Conclusions.  Aliso 10(4): 573-582.
 Carlquist and J.R. Grant. 2005. Wood anatomy of Gentianaceae, tribe Helieae: Diversification in relation to ecology, habit, and systematics; the effect of sample diameter.  Brittonia 57(3): 276-291.
 Ewan, J.
 1948. A revision of 'Macrocarpaea', a neotropical genus of shrubby gentians. Contr. U.S. Natl. Herb. 29: 209-250.
 1950. New records of neotropical Gentianaceae. Proc. Biol. Soc. Wash. 63: 163-166.
 1951. New records of neotropical Gentianaceae-II. Proc. Biol. Soc. Wash. 64: 131-134.
 Gilg, E. 1895. Gentianaceae. Pg 50–108 of A. Engler and K. Prantl, Eds., Die Natürlichen Pflanzenfamilien. Vol. 4(2). Verlag von Wilhelm Engelmann, Leipzig.
Grant, J.R.
 2003. De Macrocarpaeae Grisebach (ex Gentianaceis) speciebus novis II:  Typification of the Ruiz & Pavon names. Harvard Papers in Botany 7(2): 423-436.
 2004. De Macrocarpaeae Grisebach (ex Gentianaceis) speciebus novis V: Twenty-three new species largely from Peru, and typification of all species in the genus. Harvard Papers in Botany 9(1): 11-49.
 2005a. De Macrocarpaeae Grisebach (ex Gentianaceis) speciebus novis VI: seed morphology, palynology, an infrageneric classification, and another twenty-three new species, largely from Colombia. Harvard Papers in Botany 9(2): 305-342.
 2005b. Seed and pollen morphology of the Neotropical moon-gentians (Macrocarpaea: Gentianaceae). P1148. XVII International Botanical Congress, Vienna, Austria. 17–23 July 2005. Abstracts. P. 420. Robidruck, Vienna.
 2007. De Macrocarpaeae Grisebach (ex Gentianaceis) speciebus novis VII: four new species and two natural hybrids. Harvard Papers in Botany 11(2): 129-139.
 2008. De Macrocarpaeae Grisebach (ex Gentianaceis) speciebus novis VIII: two new species from Ecuador. Harvard Papers in Botany 13(2): 253-259.
 Grant, J.R. and L. Struwe. 
 2000. Morphological evolution and neotropical biogeography in 'Macrocarpaea''' (Gentianaceae: Helieae). American Journal of Botany 87 (suppl.): 131.
 2001. De Macrocarpaeae Grisebach (ex Gentianaceis) speciebus novis I: An introduction to the genus 'Macrocarpaea' and three new species from Colombia, Ecuador, and Guyana. Harvard Papers in Botany 5: 489-498.
 2003. De Macrocarpaeae Grisebach (ex Gentianaceis) speciebus novis III: Six new species of moon-gentians (Macrocarpaea, Gentianaceae: Helieae) from Parque Nacional Podocarpus, Ecuador. Harvard Papers in Botany 8(1): 61-81.
 Grant, J.R. and R.E. Weaver. 2003. De Macrocarpaeae Grisebach (ex Gentianaceis) speciebus novis IV: Twelve new species of 'Macrocarpaea' (Gentianaceae: Helieae) from Central and South America, and the first report of the presence of a stipule in the family. Harvard Papers in Botany 8(1): 83-109.
 Grisebach, A. H. R. 1839 [1838]. Genera et Species Gentianarum. Stuttgart.
 Nilsson, S. 1968. Pollen morphology in the genus 'Macrocarpaea' (Gentianaceae) and its taxonomical significance. Svensk Bot. Tidskr. 62: 338-364.
 Struwe, L., and V. A. Albert. Eds.  2002. Gentianaceae: Systematics and Natural History.  Cambridge University Press, Cambridge
 Thiv, M., and J. R. Grant. 2002. 'Macrocarpaea' (Gentianaceae) in: Flora de la República de Cuba, Fasc. 6(1): 23-26.
 Weaver, R. E.
 1969. Cytotaxonomic notes on some neotropical Gentianaceae.  Ann. Missouri Bot. Gard. 56: 439-443.
 1972b. The genus 'Macrocarpaea' in Costa Rica. J. Arnold Arb. 53: 553-557.
 1974. The reduction of 'Rusbyanthus' and the tribe Rusbyantheae (Gentianaceae). J. Arnold Arb. 55: 300-302.
 Weaver, R. E., and L. Rüdenberg. 1975. Cytotaxonomic notes on some Gentianaceae''. J. Arnold Arb. 56(2): 211-222.

External links
 Jason Grant at Université de Neuchâtel 
 Lena Struwe's homepage

 
Gentianaceae genera